The fourth election to the Lothian Regional Council was held on 3 May 1990 as part of the wider 1990 Scottish regional elections. The result saw Labour strengthening their position on the council.

Aggregate results

Ward results

References

1990 Scottish local elections
1990